Ahmed Muztaba Zamal is a Bangladeshi film critic. He is editor of Celluloid, a quarterly film magazine, and is director of the Dhaka International Film Festival.

Biography
Zamal first attended a film festival, the Munich Film Festival, in 1991. The following year he started the Dhaka International Film Festival.

Major film festivals, in addition to the juries selected by the festival to award its prizes, often feature independent juries that follow their own criteria to award their own prizes. Zamal was a member of the International Federation of Film Critics (FIPRESCI) independent jury at the Berlin International Film Festival in 1998 and 2018; at the Cannes Film Festival in 2002, 2005, and 2009; and at the Venice Film Festival in 2007.

Zamal directed several documentaries, starting with the 2006 Truth and Beyond, which explores Islam in Bangladesh. Later that year he made Smritir Minar (A Monument of Memories), which records Bangladeshi participation in the 2006 Vijay Diwas (Victory Day) ceremonies of the Eastern Command of the Indian Army in Kolkata. The event commemorates the end of the Indo-Pakistani War of 1971 and Bangladesh Liberation War. His 2011 Pahela Baishakh shows the Bengali New Year festivities.

References

External links
Dhaka Film Festival 
FIPRESCI - Home

Bangladeshi film critics
Living people
Year of birth missing (living people)